Vriesea eltoniana is a plant species in the genus Vriesea. This species is endemic to Brazil.

References

eltoniana
Flora of Brazil